Augustus Oga (born 2 June 1960) is a Kenyan boxer. He competed in the men's middleweight event at the 1984 Summer Olympics.

References

External links
 

1960 births
Living people
Kenyan male boxers
Olympic boxers of Kenya
Boxers at the 1984 Summer Olympics
Place of birth missing (living people)
Middleweight boxers